Masato Hirano may refer to:

 Masato Hirano (swimmer) (born 1975), Japanese swimmer
 Masato Hirano (voice actor) (born 1955), Japanese voice actor